Palmas is a municipality in the south of the Brazilian state of Paraná.  Palmas is located in the mountainous area of Paraná and is in the mesoregion of South-Central Paraná.  Palmas is the capital of the microregion of the same name. The population is 51,755 (2020 est.) in an area of 1557.90 km². The elevation is 1,056 m.

References

External links
http://www.citybrazil.com.br/pr/palmas (in Portuguese)

Municipalities in Paraná